
Restaurant De Trechter is a defunct restaurant in Amsterdam, in the Netherlands. It was a fine dining restaurant that was awarded one Michelin star in 1985 and retained that rating until 1995.

Owner and head chef of De Trechter was Jan de Wit. De Wit closed down De Trechter and moved on to restaurant De Nederlanden, after a conflict about bins and binbags with the municipality of Amsterdam.

About the conflict he said:

After closure of De Trechter the building was taken over by restaurant En Route, that was replaced in 2008 by Magnolia.

See also
List of Michelin starred restaurants in the Netherlands

References 

Restaurants in Amsterdam
Michelin Guide starred restaurants in the Netherlands
Defunct restaurants in the Netherlands